Tankarda is a historical town in Chomu Jaipur district of Rajasthan in India.

References

Cities and towns in Jaipur district